Samuel Earl Hoger (born June 28, 1980) is an American retired mixed martial artist, poker player, and an actor, most notable for appearing on the first season of The Ultimate Fighter,  a reality television series produced by the Ultimate Fighting Championship and broadcast on Spike TV. Hoger has trained with Miletich Fighting Systems in Bettendorf, Iowa and is belted in the Miletich Fighting Systems.

Background
Hoger was born in Baton Rouge, Louisiana to a Panamanian mother and an American father. Before his first birthday, Sam moved with his family to Germany where his father – a major in the US Military – was stationed. From Germany the family moved to Panama due to the United States invasion of Panama. Hoger has two sisters. Hoger got interested in martial arts as a kid when he saw Karate Kid in the movies, and subsequently his mother placed him in karate lessons in Panama. The family moved to Alaska when Sam was a teenager, where he got interested in Brazilian jiu-jitsu and started training under Ted Stickel around the age of 13.

Sam graduated from Chugiak High School and got a senatorial nomination to United States Military Academy. However, Hoger attended New Mexico Military Institute from where he dropped out. He then received a merit-based scholarship to LSU from where he graduated with two Political Science degrees (Theory and Government) Class of 2002. Afterwards he studied for his MBA at St. Ambrose University in Davenport, Iowa. He was also the founder of the Brazilian jiu-jitsu Club at LSU.

Mixed martial arts career

Early career 
Hoger made his amateur debut on January 27, 2001, when he faced Robert DiMarco at Reality Combat Fighting 9. He won the fight via rear-naked choke submission. He then faced John Accardo at Reality Combat Fighting 14 on March 15, 2002. He won via referee stoppage TKO.

Hoger would turn professional in June 2003, and compiled a professional record of 4–0 before being signed to compete on The Ultimate Fighter.

The Ultimate Fighter

Hoger made it to the semi-finals on the show without having to fight.  His comments at the time suggested a calculated and Machiavellian effort on his part to win the show by fighting as late as possible. In the show, he maintained a distance from others and made it a point to keep everyone confused, including his own teammates. He was eliminated by Forrest Griffin in the semi finals via TKO after a first round Hoger likely won. In the second round, Forrest came out looking to finish, got Hoger in the clinch, knocked him down with a series of knees and finished him with punches to the head.

On the night of The Ultimate Fighter 1 Finale, he won a Unanimous decision against Bobby Southworth, who was considered to be the best light heavyweight on the show by Chuck Liddell, Randy Couture, and Dana White, due to his pre-show professional record.

Ultimate Fighting Championship 

Hoger faced Stephan Bonnar at UFC Ultimate Fight Night on August 6, 2005. He lost the fight via unanimous decision, giving him the first loss of his career. He then faced Jeff Newton at UFC 56 on November 19, 2005. He won the fight via second round rear-naked choke.

In his third fight in the promotion, Hoger faced then-undefeated Rashad Evans at UFC Ultimate Fight Night 4 on April 6, 2006. He lost the fight via split decision. Hoger faced Lyoto Machida at UFC 67 on February 3, 2007. He lost the fight via unanimous decision, and was released from the promotion shortly after.

Post-UFC career 

In his first fight outside of the UFC, Hoger replaced Mike Ciesnolevicz to face longtime MMA fighter Vernon White at IFL: Moline on April 7, 2007. Hoger lost the fight via rear-naked choke, giving him three losses in a row.

He then faced Jason Dolloff at World Championship Fighting 4 on September 19, 2008. Hoger knocked out Dolloff just under twenty seconds into the first round, snapping his three-fight losing streak in the process. Hoger faced Johnathan Ivey at Urban Rumble Championship on January 24, 2009, for the URC Heavyweight Championship. He won the fight via third round kimura to win the Heavyweight Championship.

Hoger was scheduled to face Alistair Overeem at UG 11: A Decade of Fights on October 17, 2009. However, Hoger was removed from the bout and was replaced by Tony Sylvester.

He faced Patrick Miller at Worldwide Gladiator on April 9, 2010. He won the fight via TKO.

In his latest fight, he faced Jody Poff at Fight Night MMA on June 5, 2010. He won the fight via armbar submission.

Personal life 
After spending part of the time in Houston, Texas before Machida and White bouts, Hoger decided to relocate completely to Houston. He opened Miletich Fighting Systems Houston gym in 2007 before founding his own Hoger MMA gym in Houston which opened on April 13, 2009.

In 2015, Hoger moved to Los Angeles, California, and founded Real Martial Arts gym.

Awards 
 In 1996, Sam Hoger was awarded the Alaska State Medal of Heroism for saving a drowning teammate by Gov. Tony Knowles.
 Sam Hoger received his black belt from Ted Stickel of Gracie Barra Alaska on July 1, 2009, being only the second person to receive this distinguishing honor from Ted Stickel.

Championships and accomplishments 
Urban Rumble Championship
URC Heavyweight Championship (One time)

Mixed martial arts record 

|-
| Win
| align=center| 10–4
| Jody Poff
| Submission (armbar)
| FNMMA – Fight Night MMA
| 
| align=center| 1
| align=center| 0:50
| Fort Wayne, Indiana, United States
| 
|-
| Win
| align=center| 9–4
| Patrick Miller
| TKO (punches)
| WG – Worldwide Gladiator
| 
| align=center| 1
| align=center| 0:27
| Pasadena, Texas, United States
| 
|-
| Win
| align=center| 8–4
| Johnathan Ivey
| Submission (kimura)
| URC – Urban Rumble Championship
| 
| align=center| 3
| align=center| 0:35
| Pasadena, Texas, United States
| 
|-
| Win
| align=center| 7–4
| Jason Dolloff
| TKO (punches)
| World Championship Fighting – World Championship Fighting 4
| 
| align=center| 1
| align=center| 0:17
| Wilmington, Massachusetts, United States
| 
|-
| Loss
| align=center| 6–4
| Vernon White
| Submission (rear-naked choke)
| International Fight League – Moline
| 
| align=center| 2
| align=center| 3:25
| Moline, Illinois, United States
| 
|-
| Loss
| align=center| 6–3
| Lyoto Machida
| Decision (unanimous)
| UFC 67
| 
| align=center| 3
| align=center| 5:00
| Las Vegas, Nevada, United States
| 
|-
| Loss
| align=center| 6–2
| Rashad Evans
| Decision (split)
| UFC Fight Night 4
| 
| align=center| 3
| align=center| 5:00
| Las Vegas, Nevada, United States
| 
|-
| Win
| align=center| 6–1
| Jeff Newton
| Submission (rear-naked choke)
| UFC 56
| 
| align=center| 2
| align=center| 2:05
| Las Vegas, Nevada, United States
| 
|-
| Loss
| align=center| 5–1
| Stephan Bonnar
| Decision (unanimous)
| UFC Ultimate Fight Night
| 
| align=center| 3
| align=center| 5:00
| Las Vegas, Nevada, United States
| 
|-
| Win
| align=center| 5–0
| Bobby Southworth
| Decision (unanimous)
| The Ultimate Fighter 1 Finale
| 
| align=center| 3
| align=center| 5:00
| Las Vegas, Nevada, United States
| 
|-
| Win
| align=center| 4–0
| Chris Herring
| Submission (guillotine choke)
| MMA – Eruption
| 
| align=center| 1
| align=center| 2:37
| Lowell, Massachusetts, United States
| 
|-
| Win
| align=center| 3–0
| Adam Maciejewski
| Submission (triangle choke)
| EC 54 – Extreme Challenge 54
| 
| align=center| 1
| align=center| 1:29
| Lakemoor, Illinois, United States
| 
|-
| Win
| align=center| 2–0
| Josh Hendricks
| Submission (arm-triangle choke)
| NLF – Next Level Fighting
| 
| align=center| 1
| align=center| 4:41
| Steubenville, Ohio, United States
| 
|-
| Win
| align=center| 1–0
| Matt Freeland
| KO (kick)
| AOW – Art of War
| 
| align=center| 1
| align=center| 3:15
| Kalispell, Montana, United States
|

Amateur mixed martial arts record

|-
|Win
|align=center|2–0
|John Accardo
|TKO (referee stoppage)
|RCF 14: Reality Combat Fighting 14
|
|align=center|1
|align=center|0:36
|United States
|
|-
|Win
|align=center|1–0
|Robert DiMarco
|Submission (rear-naked choke)
|RCF 9: Reality Combat Fighting 9
|
|align=center|1
|align=center|0:26
|Houma, Louisiana, United States
|
|

References

External links

1980 births
Living people
American male mixed martial artists
Mixed martial artists from Alaska
Light heavyweight mixed martial artists
Mixed martial artists utilizing karate
Mixed martial artists utilizing Brazilian jiu-jitsu
American practitioners of Brazilian jiu-jitsu
People awarded a black belt in Brazilian jiu-jitsu
American male karateka
Ultimate Fighting Championship male fighters